Otis Roberts (born 17 August 1968) is a retired Grenadan international footballer.

Career

Club career
Roberts played for Barnet during the 1990-91 season.

Roberts played in England for Crystal Palace, although he never made a first-team league appearance for the club. In August 1996, he began a trial with Norwich City, although that proved unsuccessful. He later played in Hong Kong for Golden and Eastern, and in Belgium for FC Ghent and FC Hoogstraten. He returned to England in 1998 to play for Harrow Borough and Hendon.

International career
Roberts has international caps for Grenada. He made two appearances in 2000.

Personal life
His nephew is fellow footballer Jason Roberts.

After football
Roberts has been a football agent, representing players such as Zesh Rehman. He also runs his nephew Jason Roberts's charitable foundation.

References

Living people
Grenadian footballers
Grenada international footballers
Association football agents
Barnet F.C. players
Crystal Palace F.C. players
1968 births
English sportspeople of Grenadian descent
Association football forwards
Association football midfielders